Thomas George Barnett (born July 11, 1937 in Alliance, Ohio) is a former professional American football halfback and defensive back in the National Football League.

References

1937 births
Living people
People from Alliance, Ohio
Players of American football from Ohio
American football running backs
American football defensive backs
Pittsburgh Steelers players
Purdue Boilermakers football players
Minnesota Vikings players